Darbhanga Medical College and Hospital is a government medical college having hospital facilities at Darbhanga, Bihar. It was established in the year 1946. College is currently affiliated with Aryabhatta Knowledge University.

History 
The medical college was constructed with the efforts of King Rameshwar Singh of Khandavala Dynasty who also built the beautiful Raj Nagar Palace in Madhubani.

According to the incidence, the Prince of Wales, also called Edward VIII, came to Bihar in 1925. Darbhanga Maharaj Rameshwar Singh requested him to visit a medical school at Patna named ‘Temple of Medical Learning’.

The Prince, who subsequently became King Edward VIII, was very impressed by working of the medical school. On behalf of the British government, he offered to the Maharaja to upgrade the medical school into a new college for medicine.

The older, ‘Temple of Medical Learning’ was decided to be shifted somewhere else in Bihar. According to old folks, the ‘Temple of Medical Learning’, was earlier decided to be transferred to, Muzaffarpur. 

The twist in the tale comes here! The maharaja accepted the shifting of medical school but proposed its setup at Darbhanga. Eventually, his wish was fulfilled and, paved the way for the medical College in the city. 

The Raj family donated 300 acres of prime land in the middle, of the twin city of Darbhanga-Laheriasarai along with Rs 6 lakh for setting up and expansion the Medical College.

Initially, the medical college was located, inside today's police hospital situated near Lohia Chowk of the city. Before a start, the king had to deposit an amount of Rs 25,000 to the British to shift the medical college. After the king, his son Kameshwar Singh upgraded and renamed the ‘Temple of Medical Learning’ to Darbhanga Medical College in 1946.

About college
The college is identified by the Government of India as a site for an All India Institute of Medical Sciences (AIIMS) .

See also

Education in India
Education in Bihar
List of educational institutions in Patna
All India Council for Technical Education
All India Institute of Medical Sciences Patna

References

External links 
 College website
 Hospital website
Aryabhatta Knowledge University

Medical colleges in Bihar
Education in Darbhanga
Educational institutions established in 1946
Hospitals in Bihar
Colleges affiliated to Aryabhatta Knowledge University
1946 establishments in India